is a 2009 Japanese supernatural horror film produced in honour of the tenth anniversary of the Ju-on series. Like most films in the franchise, Black Ghost is told through anachronistic order, with each vignettes titled after a character central to the story. The sequel revolves around a hospitalized young girl who discovers that a cyst is found in her body, which is actually the physical remnant of her unborn twin.

Plot
Black Ghost is divided into seven segments in the following order: Tetsuya (徹也), Yuko (裕子), Ayano (綾乃), Fukie (芙季絵), Yokota (横田), Mariko (真理子), and Kiwako (季和子).

After collapsing at school, a young girl, Fukie Yokota, is rushed to the clinic. She and her mother, Kiwako, go back home after she recovered, but Fukie suddenly lets out strange meowing and croaking noises and mutters to her father that he will kill "that woman".

During a psychology test where Fukie is hypnotized, she becomes even more unstable, having to stay at the hospital and be cared for by a nurse, Yuko. The doctor tells Kiwako that a cyst is discovered in Fukie's body, but it is actually the physical remnant of Fukie's unborn twin who merged with her body during birth. Knowing that Fukie's condition is supernatural, Kiwako contacts her sister, Mariko, who is spiritually aware, to examine Fukie. Concluding that Fukie's twin is a parasite, she performs an exorcism to expel the evil spirit, but the spirit tricks Mariko to expel Fukie's spirit instead. The spirit-possessed Fukie arrives at Mariko's house and kills Mariko and her husband and son, despite her trying to buy time for them to escape.

The spirit in Fukie's body is taken back to the hospital and in a last-ditch effort, Kiwako takes Fukie's body and jumps off the rooftop with it, killing them both. However, this act sets the spirit free to terrorize an employee of Kiwako's husband, Ayano, as well as forcing Kiwako's husband to murder her, fulfilling the spirit's prediction. The spirit also goes to Yuko's apartment to kill her and her young neighbor, Tetsuya.

Cast

Release
The film was released alongside its co-installment White Ghost on DVD in the UK on April 26, 2010, and was released onto DVD and Blu-ray in the US on May 17, 2011.

References

External links 
 
 
 

2000s supernatural horror films
Films set in Japan
2000s Japanese-language films
Japanese haunted house films
2009 horror films
Japanese horror films
Japanese ghost films
2009 films
Films directed by Mari Asato
2000s psychological horror films
Films about curses
Ju-On films
Toei Company films
2000s Japanese films

ja:呪怨#呪怨 黒い少女